In warfare, a theater or theatre is an area in which important military events occur or are in progress. A theater can include the entirety of the airspace, land and sea area that is or that may potentially become involved in war operations.

Theater of war 
In his book On War, Carl von Clausewitz defines the term  Kriegstheater (translating the older, 17th-century Latin term theatrum belli) as one that:

Theater of operations 
Theater of operations (TO) is a sub-area within a theater of war. The boundary of a TO is defined by the commander who is orchestrating or providing support for specific combat operations within the TO.

Theater of operations is divided into strategic directions or military regions depending on whether it is a war or peacetime. The United States Armed Forces split into Unified Combatant Commands (regions) that are assigned to a particular theater of military operations. A strategic direction is a group of armies also known as a task (field) forces or battlegroups.

A strategic command or direction in general essence would combine a number of tactical military formations or operational command. In the modern military, a strategic command is better known as a combat command that may be a combination of groups.

Soviet and Russian Armed Forces 
The Soviet and Russian Armed Forces classify a large geographic subdivision—such as continental geographic territories with their bordering maritime areas, islands, adjacent coasts
and airspace—as a theater.

This geographical division aids strategic and operational planning, allowing military operations of fronts. Fronts were originally named in accordance with their theater of operations; for example the Southwestern Front (Russian Empire) (1914–1918), the 1st Ukrainian Front (1943–1945, which fought in Ukraine, Poland, Germany, and Czechoslovakia), and the Northern Front (Soviet Union) (June to August 1941). In peacetime, lacking the urgencies of a strategic direction, fronts were transformed into military regions (districts) responsible for an assigned section of operations.

In 1986 the U.S. Department of Defense's Soviet Military Power identified ten continental and four oceanic TVDs, however, most being merely geographical areas without forces or headquarters: North American, South American, African, Australian, Antarctic, Arctic Ocean, Atlantic, Indian Ocean, and Pacific. Four others - the Far Eastern, Western, South-Western, and Southern, had identified headquarters established in 1979 and 1984. Plans appear to have existed to form a Northwestern TVD headquarters on the basis of the Staff of the Leningrad Military District.

In their most modern form, High Commands for the TVDs were first reestablished in February 1979 for the Far East. Harrison wrote in the 2020s that the new command encompassed the Far East Military District and the Transbaikal Military District. An official military encyclopedia published after the Fall of the Soviet Union stated, said Harrison, that the Soviet Pacific Fleet, an air army, and an air defence corps were also operationally subordinated to the new formation; and that the high command "coordinated" with the armies of Vietnam, Laos, Cambodia, and Mongolia. The headquarters was set up at Ulan-Ude, near Lake Baikal. The RAND Corporation said in 1984 that the Soviet air and ground forces in Mongolia [subordinate to the Transbaikal Military District] and elements of the Mongolian Ground Forces and Mongolian Air Force were also at its disposal. In September 1984 three more High Commands were established: the Western (HQ Legnica), South-Western (HQ Kishinev), and Southern (HQ Baku)

United States 

The term theater of operations was defined in the American field manuals as the land and sea areas to be invaded or defended, including areas necessary for administrative activities incident to the military operations (chart 12). In accordance with the experience of World War I, it was usually conceived of as a large land mass over which continuous operations would take place and was divided into two chief areas—the combat zone, or the area of active fighting, and the communications zone, or area required for administration of the theater. As the armies advanced, both these zones and the areas into which they were divided would shift forward to new geographic areas of control.

See also 
 Battlespace
 China Burma India Theater
 European Theater of Operations
 European theatre of World War II
 AfPak
 Locus of control
 Unified Combatant Command
 Western Theater of the American Civil War
 Formations of the Soviet Army

References 

Warfare